Soberón or Soberon may refer to:

Avelino Soberón (born 1948), Mexican Olympic rower
Claudia Soberón (born 1977), in Mexico City, Mexico; a singer and an actress
Edgar Soberón, Cuban born painter and printmaker, born in Cienfuegos, Cuba in 1962
Francisco Soberón, human rights activist in Peru
Héctor Soberón (born 1964), Mexican actor
José Villa Soberón (born 1950), Cuban artist, particularly known for his public sculptures around Havana